Loretta Lynn Writes 'Em and Sings 'Em is a compilation album by American country music singer-songwriter Loretta Lynn. It was released on June 8, 1970, by Decca Records. The album is composed of five previously released recordings and six new recordings.

All the songs on the album were written by Lynn, except one song that was co-written with her sister, Peggy Sue Wells. This was Lynn's first album to be made up entirely of songs written by her.

Critical reception

In the issue dated June 27, 1970, Billboard published a review that said, "In the tradition of country greats, Loretta Lynn is an outstanding writer as well as singer. Here she proves it, for the songs are her own, including the big single, "I Know How". Others are "What's the Bottle Done to My Baby", "Your Squaw Is on the Warpath" and "Fist City". Must merchandise."

Cashbox published a review in the June 20, 1970 issue which said, "Loretta Lynn is showcased singing eleven of her own songs, and this includes, of course, a number of her hits. "I Know How", her recent smash, is here as well as her brand new charter, "You Wanna Give Me A Lift". Also included are past hits "Wings Upon Your Horns", "Your Squaw Is on the Warpath", and "Fist City". This will be a very, very big album."

Commercial performance 
The album peaked at No. 8 on the US Billboard Hot Country LP's chart.

The first single, "I Know How" was released in February 1970 and peaked at. No. 4 on the US Billboard Hot Country Singles chart. "You Wanna Give Me a Lift" was issued as the second single in May 1970 and peaked at No. 6.

Recording
Recording sessions for the new songs featured on the album took place at Bradley's Barn in Mount Juliet, Tennessee, on December 8, 22 and 23, 1969. Two of the new songs were recorded during sessions for previous albums. "What Has the Bottle Done to My Baby" was recorded during a session for 1969's Woman of the World/To Make a Man on May 28, 1969. "You Wanna Give Me a Lift" was recorded during the October 1, 1969 session for 1970's Here's Loretta Singing "Wings Upon Your Horns".

All of the songs featured on the album were recorded at Bradley's Barn except for "You Ain't Woman Enough (To Take My Man), which was recorded at Columbia Recording Studio in Nashville on November 15, 1965.

Track listing

Personnel
Adapted from the album liner notes and Decca recording session records.
Harold Bradley – electric bass guitar
Owen Bradley – producer
David Briggs – piano
Floyd Cramer – piano
Ray Edenton – acoustic guitar
Ralph Emery – liner notes
Larry Estes – drums
Buddy Harman – drums
Junior Huskey – bass
The Jordanaires – background vocals
Loretta Lynn – lead vocals
Grady Martin – electric guitar
Bob Moore – bass
Harold Morrison – banjo
Norbert Putnam – bass
Hargus Robbins – piano
Hal Rugg – steel guitar
Jerry Shook – guitar
Jerry Stembridge – acoustic guitar
Bob Thompson – banjo
Pete Wade – guitar
Joe Zinkan – bass

Charts 
Album

Singles

References 

1970 compilation albums
Loretta Lynn compilation albums
Albums produced by Owen Bradley
Decca Records albums